A nicotine nasal spray is a nasal spray that contains a small dose of nicotine, which enters the blood by being absorbed through the lining of the nose. This helps stop nicotine cravings and relieves symptoms that occur when a person is trying to quit smoking. A prescription is needed for nicotine nasal spray in many countries. In the United Kingdom, it can be purchased in a pharmacy as an Over-the-counter drug.

External links 
 Nicotine nasal spray entry in the public domain NCI Dictionary of Cancer Terms

Smoking cessation
Nasal sprays
Smoking
Stimulants